Víctor Antonio Legrotaglie (born 29 May 1937) is a former footballer and former coach. He played as a midfielder. He began his professional career in Gimnasia y Esgrima de Mendoza in 1953, where he became the institution's greatest idol and emblem. Then in 1959, he moved to Chacarita Juniors, where he won a second division national championship. He returned to Mendoza in the mid-1960s to wear the Gimnasia colors again. Three years later he had a stint at Argentino de Mendoza to, a year later, return to the  Lobo Mendoza  for the third time, staying with it for three years. During that period, he won an official regional tournament and an unofficial national one, the Confraternidad Tournament organized by Boca Juniors in 1965.

In 1967, he briefly returned to the Mendoza Academy but in the middle of that year he went to the Province of San Juan to put on the shirt of Juventud Alianza. His fourth stage in  Mensana  came at the beginning of 1968 where he began to dispute the old national championship. In 1973, he played in Independiente Rivadavia —the classic rival of Lobo, but at the time it was customary for Mendoza clubs to borrow players to represent the province at the national level—to play the tournament of that year. In 1976, he went to the Province of La Rioja to play in Américo Tesorieri and where a few months later he ended up retiring professionally.

He is known for being considered the greatest soccer player of all time in Mendoza soccer, surpassing the other players in the middle, Enzo Pérez — current player and with time in the national team — and Hugo Cirilo Mémoli. The  Victor  stood out for his great talent for throwing pipes but his greatest skill turned out to be the free kicks and the Olympic goals, since he scored sixty and six and twelve goals respectively throughout his career.

Club career

Early career 

Born in Las Heras, Mendoza, Legrotaglie began playing football as a child at the Club Sociedad Italiana 5 de Octubre —currently the Vicente Polimeni sports center—, an institution that was founded by his grandfather and where his father and uncle managed to become presidents. It disputed the Lasherina Soccer League existing at that time. He came to Gimnasia y Esgrima de Mendoza, by chance, thanks to "Chupino" Carlos Cardone —an acquaintance of his and a "Lobo" player in that then—that he asked her to accompany him by taking his training bag —since those who did so entered the stadium for free— to the match between Gimnasia and Gutiérrez corresponding to the Torneo Vendimia of 1953. It was thus that with only sixteen years of age and in the line of substitutes, the "Mona" Alfredo García —current coach of the Blanquinegro who was following him — Twenty minutes into the second half after the injury of one of the forwards, he asked him if he wanted to enter, to which he replied yes and did so by scoring two goals for the final victory of Mensana by 6:2. Once he turned seventeen, he signed his first professional contract. Prior to these events, because his family was a fan of Independiente Rivadavia tried to stay there just like in Huracán Las Heras —a club that was convenient for him because of its proximity— but in both they told him that he was very thin —he weighed sixty-two kilos— and they did not see a future for that reason.

Professional career 

In 1959, he was transferred to Chacarita Juniors where he became champion of the First Division B —Second Division of football back then— that year. A year later he returned to the Lobo Mendoza until 1963 where he went on to wear the shirt of Argentino de Mendoza until 1964, the year in which he returned to the Lobo and won his first local tournament and in 1965 the Fellowship Tournament that offered the possibility of facing Boca Juniors. One year earlier, more precisely on March 1, 1964, playing unofficially for Godoy Cruz Antonio Tomba in a friendly, he had the pleasure of facing Santos of Pelé with whom he lost 2:3 where O Rei greeted him personally.

In the second half of 1967, after his second and short stint at the Mendoza Academy, he went to play in the next province, and did so in Juventud Alianza to dispute the Regional Tournament and then the Promotional Tournament. But it was in his fourth stage in the  Lobo  that he reached the greatest laurels of his career by integrating the famous team — for being the best team in the interior in 1971 — of  Los Compadres . . He managed to remain undefeated for two and a half years at home, qualify consecutively for three National Championships and score goals against Argentine soccer greats such as San Lorenzo de Almagro by 2:5 at the Viejo Gasómetro, and others recognized as Newell's Old Boys by the same score but at home.

In 1973, he wore the shirt of Independiente Rivadavia to compete in the National Championship 1973 together with his fellow gymnasts Guayama , Felman and «Documento» Ibánez.

He finished his playing career at the end of 1974 in Gimnasia, but it was only on September 24, 1975, against River Plate, in a match corresponding to the Championship National 1975 played at the Bautista Gargantini Stadium, which had its farewell —although without playing—, where the Lobo players picked it up and made it say goodbye to the people. He returned to the ring two years later to play for Américo Tesorieri of the La Rioja, this being his last official club.

El Víctor was highlighted by magazines such as El Gráfico —in which he became the cover in 1971— by referring to him as:  He also scored a total of 66 goals from free kicks, the joint-third highest in history.

It was wanted —in its best period— by two powerful teams from the old continent such as Real Madrid and Inter Milan and other clubs such as New York Cosmos from United States in which Beckenbauer and Pelé played. He never agreed to leave because he settled for what he always had in his home province, in addition to the fact that at that time soccer abroad was not conceived as an economic salvation for soccer players.

Managing career 

As a coach he directed Gimnasia y Esgrima de Mendoza on several occasions. In 1981, he managed to make the Lobo Mendoza champion of the domestic tournament. Later, he had several internships but this time in the tournaments Argentino A and B. His last experience at the Lobo del Parque was in 2004, when unexpectedly the coach Walter De Felippe resigned from his position a few days before his debut.

Notes

References

External links 
 
 Interview to Víctor Antonio Legrotaglie in Fútbol Para Todos
 Interview to Víctor Antonio Legrotaglie en Canal Acequia

1937 births
Living people
Argentine footballers
Sportspeople from Mendoza, Argentina
Gimnasia y Esgrima de Mendoza footballers
Chacarita Juniors footballers
Independiente Rivadavia footballers